"Side Saddle" is a hit single which was number one in the UK Singles Chart for four weeks from 27 March 1959.

The honky-tonk style tune, composed and played by British popular music pianist Russ Conway, was written as part of the score for a television musical adaptation of Beauty and the Beast. Conway, sitting in the TV rehearsal room, was asked to write a last-minute tune for one small scene set in a ballroom. He wrote 16 bars as an "olde-world gavotte" and hastily titled it "Side Saddle" in the margin.

The song was a staple of the BBC's Housewives' Choice radio programme.

References 

UK Singles Chart number-one singles
1959 singles
1959 songs
Columbia Graphophone Company singles